The Journal of Medical Marketing is a peer-reviewed academic journal that publishes papers four times a year in the field of Management. The journal's editor is Brian D Smith. It has been in publication since 2000 and is currently published by SAGE Publications.

Scope 
The Journal of Medical Marketing publishes a range of practice papers, research articles and professional briefings written by experts in the industry. The journal contains articles that focus on the issues of key importance to medical marketers. The journal is primarily aimed at those in association with a company which may produce pharmaceuticals, medical devices or diagnostic equipment for the medical industry.

Abstracting and indexing 
The Journal of Medical Marketing is abstracted and indexed in the following databases:
 ABI/INFORM
 Business Source Complete 
 Business Source Corporate
 Current Abstracts – EBSCO
 SCOPUS
 TOC Premier – EBSCO

External links 
 

SAGE Publishing academic journals
English-language journals
Business and management journals
Quarterly journals
Publications established in 2000